Craig Stanley may refer to:

 Craig Stanley (footballer) (born 1983), English footballer
 Craig Stanley (cricketer) (born 1971), former English cricketer
 Craig A. Stanley (born 1955), American Democratic Party politician in the New Jersey General Assembly
 Craig Stanley (Home and Away), fictional character on Australian soap opera Home and Away